Žana Novaković (born June 24, 1985) is a female alpine skier from Bosnia and Herzegovina who competed for Bosnia and Herzegovina at the 2010 Winter Olympics. She carried her nation's flag at the 2010 Winter Olympics opening ceremony. She also competed at FIS Alpine World Ski Championships 2011.

World Cup results

Results per discipline

World Championship results

Olympic results

References

Alpine skiers at the 2010 Winter Olympics
1985 births
Living people
Serbs of Bosnia and Herzegovina
Olympic alpine skiers of Bosnia and Herzegovina
Bosnia and Herzegovina female alpine skiers
Alpine skiers at the 2014 Winter Olympics